Sharon Barrett (born September 18, 1961) is an American professional golfer who played on the LPGA Tour.

Career
Barrett was born in San Diego, California. She won several amateur tournaments, including the Junior World Golf Championships (Girls 15–17) in 1978 and 1979. She played college golf at the University of Tulsa. She won her first five tournaments and led her team to the AIAW championship. She left after her freshman year and joined the LPGA Tour.

Barrett won once on the LPGA Tour in 1984.

Professional wins (1)

LPGA Tour wins (1)

References

External links

American female golfers
Tulsa Golden Hurricane women's golfers
LPGA Tour golfers
Golfers from San Diego
1961 births
Living people